Clinton Scott Nageotte (born October 25, 1980) is a former right-handed pitcher.

Nageotte was selected by the Seattle Mariners in the 5th round (155th overall) of the 1999 Major League Baseball Draft, and played parts of three seasons for the Mariners, from  through .

He was a standout athlete at Brooklyn High School in Brooklyn, Ohio.

He resides in Ohio.

External links

1980 births
Living people
People from Parma, Ohio
Seattle Mariners players
Baseball players from Ohio
Major League Baseball pitchers
Arizona League Mariners players
Wisconsin Timber Rattlers players
San Bernardino Stampede players
San Antonio Missions players
Tacoma Rainiers players
New Orleans Zephyrs players
Long Island Ducks players
Somerset Patriots players
Edmonton Capitals players
Sportspeople from Cuyahoga County, Ohio
Peoria Javelinas players